Johnathan "Rudy" Ford (born November 1, 1994) is an American football strong safety for the Green Bay Packers of the National Football League (NFL). He played college football at Auburn, and was selected by the Arizona Cardinals in the sixth round of the 2017 NFL Draft. He has also played for the Philadelphia Eagles and Jacksonville Jaguars.

Professional career

Arizona Cardinals
Ford was drafted by the Arizona Cardinals in the sixth round, 208th overall, in the 2017 NFL Draft. On May 14, 2017, the Cardinals signed Ford to a four-year, $2.54 million contract with a signing bonus of $140,181. He played in 10 games his rookie season as a core special teamer before suffering a knee injury. He was placed on injured reserve on December 7, 2017.

Philadelphia Eagles
On August 22, 2019, Ford was traded to the Philadelphia Eagles for defensive tackle Bruce Hector. Ford was placed on injured reserve on November 23, 2019, after suffering an abdomen injury in practice.

On October 8, 2020, Ford was placed on injured reserve after suffering a hamstring injury in Week 4. He was activated on October 31, 2020.

Jacksonville Jaguars
On March 17, 2021, Ford signed a two-year, $4.2 million contract with the Jacksonville Jaguars.

On August 29, 2022, Ford was released by the Jaguars.

Green Bay Packers
On August 31, 2022, Ford was signed by the Green Bay Packers.

NFL career statistics

Regular season

References

External links
Green Bay Packers bio
Auburn Tigers bio

1994 births
Living people
People from Madison County, Alabama
Players of American football from Alabama
American football safeties
American football cornerbacks
Auburn Tigers football players
Arizona Cardinals players
Philadelphia Eagles players
Jacksonville Jaguars players
Green Bay Packers players